José Antonio Mateos García (born 27 February 1971) is a Spanish retired footballer who played as a left back.

Career

Mateos was born in San Fernando in the province of Cádiz, and began his career with Cádiz CF. He played with the B team during the 1990–91 season, helping them win their Tercera División group. He was promoted to the first team the following year, and helped them avoid La Liga relegation by winning a playoff against Figueres.

Cádiz actually were relegated in 1992–93, and found themselves in Segunda División B after a second successive relegation the following year. Mateos stayed with the club until 1998, when he joined group rivals Algeciras CF. Algeciras suffered relegation via the play-offs in his only season, and he signed for Tercera División side San Fernando, based in his hometown, in 1999. San Fernando were promoted in his first season, and avoided relegation in 2000–01. Mateos was not to be so lucky over the next two seasons, enduring Segunda División B relegation with Benidorm in 2001–02 and Motril in 2002–03.

Mateos saw out his career in the Tercera División, spending one season each with Jerez Industrial CF and Chiclana CF, before retiring in 2005 at the age of 34.

Honours
Cádiz B
Tercera División: 1990–91

Career statistics

1. Appearances in the 1991–92 La Liga relegation playoff
2. Appearances in the 1998 Segunda División B play-offs
3. Appearances in the 1999 Segunda División B relegation play-offs

References

External links

1971 births
Living people
People from San Fernando, Cádiz
Sportspeople from the Province of Cádiz
Spanish footballers
Footballers from Andalusia
Association football defenders
La Liga players
Segunda División players
Segunda División B players
Tercera División players
Cádiz CF B players
Cádiz CF players
Algeciras CF footballers
CD San Fernando players
Benidorm CF footballers
Motril CF players
Jerez Industrial CF players